John Pitt may refer to:

Politicians
John Pitt (MP for Bridgwater), 1421 – 1435, MP for Bridgwater (UK Parliament constituency)
John Pitt (of Crow Hall) (c.1673 – 1731), British Member of Parliament for St Ives and Stockbridge, probably son of George Pitt of Strathfieldsaye (d. 1694)
John Pitt (colonel) (c.1698 – 1754), British Member of Parliament and Governor of Bermuda
John Pitt (of Encombe) (1704 – 1787), British Member of Parliament for Dorchester and Wareham and Lord of Trade and the Admiralty
John Pitt (attorney) (c.1727 – 1805), British Member of Parliament for Gloucester
John Pitt, 2nd Earl of Chatham (1756 – 1835) British statesman, brother of William Pitt the Younger
John R. Pitt (1885–1971), Canadian politician

Others
John Pitt (warden), Warden of Wadham College, Oxford 16??-1648, see John Wilkins
John Pitt (cricketer) (born 1939), English cricketer
Jack Pitt, footballer
John I. Pitt (1937–1922), Australian mycologist

See also
John Pitts (disambiguation)